Cosmopterix zieglerella is a moth of the  family Cosmopterigidae. It is found from most of Europe (except Ireland and the Balkan Peninsula) east to Japan.

The wingspan is 8–11 mm. Adults are on wing in June and July.

The larvae feed on Humulus lupulus. They mine the leaves of their host plant. The mine has the form of a broad full depth corridor overlying the main veins, with broad lobelike, transparent extensions into the blade. The corridor itself is opaque and white at first, but later turns brown. The corridor are covered with silk at the inside. Most frass is ejected from the mine and grains may be trapped in silk below the mine. Pupation takes place outside of the mine.

References

zieglerella
Moths of Asia
Moths of Europe
Moths described in 1810
Humulus